Peter Laurence Black OAM (born 14 June 1943) is an Australian politician, elected as a member of the New South Wales Legislative Assembly, serving between 1999 and 2007. Black is an unaligned Councillor of the City of Broken Hill, elected in 2012.

Career
Black was born in the Sydney suburb of Hurstville and educated at Sydney Boy's Technical High School and received a Bachelor of Science from the University of New South Wales. He was a Science teacher at Willyama High School in Broken Hill before running for New South Wales Parliament. Black became a Broken Hill Council Alderman in 1977 and served a record 19 years as Mayor of Broken Hill, from 1980 until 1999.

Black represented Murray-Darling from 1999 to 2007 for the Labor Party. He was accused of having a drinking problem by other parliamentarians, including his political opponents. Black lost his seat at the 2007 New South Wales state election, after a redistribution gave the expanded Murray-Darling seat an overall National Party majority.

References

 

Members of the New South Wales Legislative Assembly
Mayors of Broken Hill
Living people
1943 births
Recipients of the Medal of the Order of Australia
Australian Labor Party members of the Parliament of New South Wales
21st-century Australian politicians